The Pentax MX was a 35 mm single-lens reflex camera produced by Asahi Optical Co, later Pentax of Japan between 1976 and 1985.
It was Pentax's flagship professional SLR until the introduction of the Pentax LX. Internally, the MX is essentially a smaller, lighter version of the Pentax KX, and otherwise has little in common with the rest of the Pentax M-series. However, the MX was designed as the mechanical twin sister of the remarkably successful entry-level Pentax ME.

The MX was solidly built, and featured a fully mechanical construction, including a mechanical shutter of the horizontal cloth type. Only the light metering system was dependent on batteries. The MX is all manual: it does not feature autofocus or autoexposure modes such as aperture-priority, shutter-speed priority, or full program.

A number of accessories were produced, among those:
Focusing Screens
 SC1: ground glass, split image device, microprism ring (standard)
 SA1: ground glass, microprism patch
 SA3: ground glass, microprism patch, for wide aperture lenses
 SB1: ground glass, split image device
 SD1: ground glass, cross collimator
 SD11: aerial image, cross collimator
 SE: ground glass
 SG: ground glass, grid
 SI: ground glass, axis,
Data backs, Dial Data MX and a bulk film back.
Motorized winder Winder MX (2 frame/s) or a Motor MX (5 frame/s)motor drive.

Like all post-42 mm screwmount Pentax cameras, the MX accepts all K-mount lenses (with the exception of the newer FA-J and DA lenses without aperture rings).

Due to its complete lack of automatic functions, but excellent array of manual controls, the MX is often selected as a camera for photography students to practice their technique. The depth-of-field preview and self-timer functions render the MX superior in this respect to the earlier and cheaper Pentax K1000.

See also
 List of Pentax products

References

 Bojidar Dimitrov's Pentax K-Mount Page: MX
 Pentax MX Manual
 Pentax MX and FA 43mm f/1.9 lens at N. Maekawa's Manual Camera website (the main page is in Japanese)

External links

MX
135 film cameras
Pentax K-mount cameras